Đorđe "Đoko" Koković (Serbian Cyrillic: Ђорђе Ђоко Коковић; born 7 December 1953) is a Serbian football coach and former player. While playing in the United States, he was known as Djoko Kokovic.

Career
After retiring from playing football, Koković became a coach. He coached the Shandong Luneng youth side from 1999 to 2000 and he coached Africa Sports National in 2010 and 2011.

Personal
His son Radomir is also a footballer.

References

External links
 NASL stats

1953 births
Living people
Sportspeople from Užice
Yugoslav footballers
Serbian footballers
Expatriate soccer players in the United States
Serbian expatriate footballers
FK Sloga Kraljevo players
FK Rad players
Association football forwards
Serbian expatriate sportspeople in China
Philadelphia Fury (1978–1980) players
North American Soccer League (1968–1984) players